Ephesus is a city in Heard County, Georgia, United States. The city was founded as "Loftin", and was incorporated as "Ephesus" in 1964, after the local church and school, which had been named for the biblical city of Ephesus in present-day Turkey. The population was 427 at the 2010 census.

Geography

Ephesus is located in the northwest corner of Heard County at  (33.405084, -85.259625). Georgia State Route 100 passes through the center of town, leading north  to Bowdon and southeast  to Franklin, the Heard County seat.

Demographics

As of the census of 2000, there were 388 people, 154 households, and 111 families residing in the town. The racial makeup of the town was 98.45% White, 0.77% African American, 0.52% Native American, and 0.26% from two or more races.

There were 154 households, out of which 35.1% had children under the age of 18 living with them, 62.3% were married couples living together, 6.5% had a female householder with no husband present, and 27.3% were non-families. 26.0% of all households were made up of individuals, and 15.6% had someone living alone who was 65 years of age or older.  The average household size was 2.52 and the average family size was 3.01.

In the town, the population was spread out, with 25.3% under the age of 18, 6.2% from 18 to 24, 30.9% from 25 to 44, 22.2% from 45 to 64, and 15.5% who were 65 years of age or older.  The median age was 36 years. For every 100 females, there were 103.1 males.  For every 100 females age 18 and over, there were 94.6 males.

The median income for a household in the town was $40,833, and the median income for a family was $44,250. Males had a median income of $30,750 versus $17,250 for females. The per capita income for the town was $19,749.  About 8.2% of families and 14.0% of the population were below the poverty line, including 25.0% of those under age 18 and 10.9% of those age 65 or over.

Education
Ephesus has a small elementary school for grades Pre-K through 5.

Gallery

References

Cities in Heard County, Georgia
Cities in Georgia (U.S. state)